Maria Salomé Schweppenhäuser (Rechtenbach, Rhineland Palatinate), 29 November 1755 – Warsaw, 5 September 1833), daughter of Heinrich Wilhelm Schweppenhäuser, a Protestant priest from Oberotterbach, and his wife, Charlotte Philippine, née Westermann, was a court chambermaid at Bad Bergzabern and Darmstadt. She was the wife of Friedrich Karl Emanuel Hauke (1737–1810), and, as such, an ancestor of the Battenberg/Mountbatten family, descended from her paternal granddaughter Julia Hauke and Prince Alexander of Hesse and by Rhine.
After the death of her father, Maria Salomé was a chambermaid at the court of Bad Bergzabern, the seat of the widowed Countess Palatine Caroline of Zweibrücken. She was later employed at the court of Darmstadt by Caroline's daughter, Princess Caroline, wife of Louis, Hereditary Prince of Hesse-Darmstadt. In 1773 Maria Salomea married Friedrich Hauke, secretary of the Count of Brühl. Brühl was summoned to Warsaw in 1782, and Friedrich Hauke became a tax collector in Poland. Friedrich and Maria Salomé's son, Johann Moritz Hauke, was a general of the Russian troops in Poland from 1816 and was elevated to Count Hauke in 1829, but was murdered in 1830, during an uprising in Warsaw, and his children went to live with their grandmother at the court of Nicholas I of Russia in Saint Petersburg. His daughter Julia married morganatically Prince Alexander of Hesse and by Rhine in 1851. Prince Alexander's older brother the Grand Duke created Julia "Countess" and later "Princess of Battenberg", a title passing on to all of their descendants, although renounced by some.

Through her granddaughter, Maria Salomé is a direct ancestor of both the British royal family and Spanish royal family. A plaque on the former rectory in Oberotterbach celebrates the town's connection to the House of Windsor. This rectory was built in 1732 by Maria Salomé's grandfather, Johann Schweppenhäuser.

Bibliography 
 Leo van de Pas: The Lineage and Ancestry of H.R.H. Prince Charles, Prince of Wales, Edinburgh, 1977
 Bernt Engelmann: Die Aufsteiger - Wie Herrschaftshäuser und Finanzimperien entstanden. Göttingen, 1989 (German)

External links 
  Unterdorfstraße in Oberotterbach. Ein Film von Stefanie Fink, SWR Fernsehen in Rheinland-Pfalz, Landesschau Donnerstag, 14. März 2013 

Battenberg family
German ladies-in-waiting
1755 births
1833 deaths
People from Südliche Weinstraße